A band collar is a standing band-shaped collar that encircles the neck without a full turndown or a collar "cape".  It can be any height or "stand", but is usually under 2" at the front, so as not to push up into the chin.  Variations of the band collar are the clerical collar, the mandarin collar and the cadet collar.

Neckwear